Sophie Kathrin Luck (born 17 October 1989) is an Australian actress best known for her roles on the television shows Blue Water High and Home and Away.

Biography

Personal life
Luck has had drama lessons since the age of seven. She has trained with the Performing Arts Academy, and is currently continuing her acting and singing courses in its professional training program. In her spare time Luck enjoys dancing, surfing, horse riding and spending time with friends.  She attended Crestwood High School (although she was tutored while on set) and undertook the Higher School Certificate in 2007. Luck is known to be a Christian and attends Hillsong Church. She has a younger sister, Stephanie, who also attended Crestwood High School.

TV/Film
Luck had a five-month role on Home and Away as Tamara Simpson. Luck starred in Blue Water High as Fiona "Fly" Watson, appearing in all three seasons. Other film and TV credits include Don't Blame Me, Snobs and Water Rats. On 3 February 2009, Luck guest starred on the Season 12 premiere of All Saints as 'Lacey'.

Awards
Luck won the 2005 Australian Film Institute Award for Best Young Actor. She was also nominated for a 2007 Nickelodeon Kids' Choice Award.

Filmography

Film

Television

References

External links
 Official Sophie Luck Website
 

Australian child actresses
Australian soap opera actresses
Actresses from Sydney
Living people
1989 births